Gaetbulibacter aestuarii is a Gram-negative, aerobic and rod-shaped bacterium from the genus of Gaetbulibacter which has been isolated from seawater from the South South Sea in Korea.

References

Flavobacteria
Bacteria described in 2012